Barbara Bedford (born Violet May Rose; July 19, 1903 – October 25, 1981) was an American actress who appeared in dozens of silent movies. Her career declined after the introduction of sound, but she continued to appear in small roles until 1945.

Early life
Barbara Bedford was born Violet May Rose on July 19, 1903, the first child to Robert William Rose, a Scottish-American interior decorator, and Barbara Rose (née Fish), who was a first generation Czech-American. She had a brother,  William Rose. The 1910 census lists the family as living in Denver, Colorado. 

She was educated in Chicago and attended Lake View High School. According to Bedford, prior to becoming an actress, she taught swimming, dancing, and gymnastics and worked as an accountant.

Career

Film 

Bedford dropped out of high school after completing 10th grade to pursue a career in film. She, alongside her family, relocated to Los Angeles. She had written many fan letters to actor William S. Hart, and he helped her get a small role in his 1920 movie The Cradle of Courage. While working as an extra that same year on The White Circle, she was noticed by fellow cast member John Gilbert, who recommended her to director Maurice Tourneur. Tourneur cast her alongside Gilbert in Deep Waters. Tourneur also cast her in The Last of the Mohicans, where she was the love interest for Alan Roscoe, whom she later married in real life.

In 1925, she appeared opposite Hart in his final film, Tumbleweeds, a key western of the silent period. She starred in the 1926 silent film Old Loves and New and in Mockery with Lon Chaney the following year.

Stage 
Bedford played Andre in Ayn Rand's Woman on Trial (better known as Night of January 16th) when it opened at the Hollywood Playhouse on October 22, 1934.

Personal life
In 1921, she married Irvin Willat, who had directed her earlier that year in The Face of the World. They divorced in less than a year. In August 1922 she married fellow actor Alan Roscoe. They divorced in 1928, but remarried in 1930. They had one daughter, Barbara Edith Roscoe. When her husband died in 1933, Bedford had a legal dispute with his friend Wallace Beery over life insurance money that Beery claimed was owed to him for debts, but which Bedford said was intended for her daughter's education.

Bedford's third and longest marriage was to actor Terry Spencer. They were married from 1940 until his death in 1954.

Later years and death
After Spencer died, Bedford lived in Jacksonville, Florida, using the name Violet Spencer as she worked in retail sales. She and her daughter, Barbara, moved to Shreveport, Louisiana in the 1970s.

Bedford died in Jacksonville, Florida, on October 25, 1981, aged 78.

Filmography

Features

 The Cradle of Courage (1920) as Nora
 Deep Waters (1920) as Betty West
 The Last of the Mohicans (1920) as Cora Munro
 Down Home (1920) as Minor Role (uncredited)
 The Big Punch (1921) as Hope Standish
 The Face of the World (1921) as Thora
 Cinderella of the Hills (1921) as Norris Gradley
 The Unfoldment (1922) as Martha Osborne
 Gleam O'Dawn (1922) as Nini
 Winning with Wits (1922) as Mary Sudan / Mary Wyatt
 Arabian Love (1922) as Nadine Fortier
 Man Under Cover (1922) as Margaret Langdon
 Step on It! (1922) as Lorraine Leighton
 Out of the Silent North (1922) as Marcette Vallois
 Alias Julius Caesar (1922) as Helen
 The Power of Love (1922) as Maria Almeda
 Tom Mix in Arabia (1922) as Janice Terhune
 Another Man's Shoes (1922) as Mercia Solano
 Romance Land (1923) as Nan Harvess
 The Tie That Binds (1923) as Mary Ellen Gray
 The Power of Love (also called Forbidden Lover) (1923)
 The Spoilers (1923) as Helen Chester
 The Acquittal (1923) as Edith Craig
 The Whipping Boss (1924) as Grace Woodward
 Women Who Give (1924) as Emily Swift
 Pagan Passions (1924) as Shirley Dangerfield
 Champion of Lost Causes (1925) as Beatrice Charles
 The Mansion of Aching Hearts (1925) as Martha
 The Mad Whirl (1925) as Margie Taylor
 Percy (1925) as Imogene Chandler
 The Talker (1925) as Barbara Farley
 The Business of Love (1925) as Barbara Richmond
 Before Midnight (1925) as Helen Saldivar
 What Fools Men (1925) as Jenny McFarlan
 Tumbleweeds (1925) as Molly Lassiter
 Old Loves and New (1926) as Marny
 The Sporting Lover (1926) as Lady Gwendolyn
 Devil's Dice (1926) as Helen Paine
 Sunshine of Paradise Alley (1926) as Sunshine O'Day
 Life of an Actress (1927) as Nora Dowen
 The Notorious Lady (1927) as Mary Marlowe / Mary Brownlee
 Backstage (1927) as Julia Joyce
 Mockery (1927) as Countess Tatiana Alexandrova
 The Girl from Gay Paree (1927) as Mary Davis
 A Man's Past (1927) as Yvonne Fontaine
 The Broken Mask (1928) as Caricia
 Marry the Girl (1928) as Elinor
 The Port of Missing Girls (1928) as Ruth King
 Manhattan Knights (1928) as Margaret
 The City of Purple Dreams (1928) as Esther Strom
 Bitter Sweets (1928) as Bett Kingston
 The Cavalier (1928) as Lucia D'Arquista
 The Haunted House (1928) as Nancy
 Smoke Bellew (1929) as Joy Gastrell
 The Heroic Lover (1929)
 Brothers (1929) as Doris LaRue
 The Love Trader (1930) as Luane
 Sunny (1930) as Margaret
 Tol'able David (1930) as Rose Kinemon
 The Lash (1930) as Lupe
 Desert Vengeance (1931) as Anne Dixon
 The Lady from Nowhere (1931) as Mollie Carter
 Too Busy to Work (1932) as Molly Hardy (scenes deleted)
 The Death Kiss (1932) as Script Girl
 Found Alive (1933) as Edith Roberts
 A Girl of the Limberlost (1934) as Elvira Carney
 Tomorrow's Youth (1934) as Miss Booth
 The World Accuses (1934) as Martha Rankin
 Sons of Steel (1934) as Miss Peters
 Circumstantial Evidence (1935) as Mrs. Goodwin (uncredited)
 On Probation (1935) as Mable Gordon
 The Keeper of the Bees (1935) as Nurse
 Condemned to Live (1935) as Martha Kristan
 The Spanish Cape Mystery (1935) as Mrs. Munn
 Three Kids and a Queen (1935) as Nurse (uncredited)
 Midnight Phantom (1935) as Kathleen Ryan
 Forced Landing (1935) as Mrs. Margaret Byrd
 Senor Jim (1936) as Mona Cartier
 Tango (1936) as Carver, Enright & Burt Receptionist (uncredited)
 Ring Around the Moon (1936) as Carol Anderson
 Brilliant Marriage (1936) as Brenda
 The Mine with the Iron Door (1936) as Secretary
 Speed (1936) as Nurse (uncredited)
 Easy Money (1936) as Mrs. Turner
 His Brother's Wife (1936) as Minor Role (uncredited)
 Born to Dance (1936) as Hector's Secretary (uncredited)
 A Day at the Races (1937) as Secretary (uncredited)
 Between Two Women (1937) as Sarah - Patricia's Maid (uncredited)
 Big City (1937) as Woman Who Screams (uncredited)
 Navy Blue and Gold (1937) as Hospital Nurse (uncredited)
 The First Hundred Years (1938) as Sadie (uncredited)
 Three Comrades (1938) as Rita - Singer Accompanied by Erich (uncredited)
 The Toy Wife (1938) as Woman in Doctor's Office (uncredited)
 Woman Against Woman (1938) as Nurse Sherwood (uncredited)
 Fast Company (1938) as MacMillen's Secretary (uncredited)
 The Chaser (1938) as Brandon's Secretary (uncredited)
 Rich Man, Poor Girl (1938) as Kate (uncredited)
 Boys Town (1938) as Catholic Nun (uncredited)
 Too Hot to Handle (1938) as MacArthur's Secretary (uncredited)
 Young Dr. Kildare (1938) as Nurse (uncredited)
 The Girl Downstairs (1938) as Anna (uncredited)
 Burn 'Em Up O'Connor (1939) as Woman in Movie House (uncredited)
 Four Girls in White (1939) as Nurse Behind Counter (uncredited)
 Idiot's Delight (1939) as Nurse #1 (uncredited)
 Within the Law (1939) as Sarah - Gilder's Secretary (uncredited)
 Sergeant Madden (1939) as Nurse (uncredited)
 Broadway Serenade (1939) as Gracie (uncredited)
 Calling Dr. Kildare (1939) as Dr. Carew's Secretary (uncredited)
 Stronger Than Desire (1939) as Miss Watson - Flagg's Secretary (uncredited)
 On Borrowed Time (1939) as Mrs. James Northrup (uncredited)
 Andy Hardy Gets Spring Fever (1939) as Miss Howard - Bank Secretary (uncredited)
 Dancing Co-Ed (1939) as Secretary (voice, uncredited)
 Bad Little Angel (1939) as Mrs. Dodd (scenes deleted)
 Joe and Ethel Turp Call on the President (1939) as Neighbor (uncredited)
 The Earl of Chicago (1940) as Martha Jackson (uncredited)
 Edison, the Man (1940) as General Powell's Nurse (uncredited)
 Florian (1940) as Kingston's Secretary (uncredited)
 We Who Are Young (1940) as Hospital Phone Operator (uncredited)
 Gold Rush Maisie (1940) as Mrs. Hartley (uncredited)
 I Love You Again (1940) as Miss Stingecombe - Larry's Secretary (uncredited)
 Boom Town (1940) as Nurse (uncredited)
 Dr. Kildare Goes Home (1940) as Carew's Secretary (uncredited)
 Sky Murder (1940) as Grand's Maid (uncredited)
 Third Finger, Left Hand (1940) as Woman at Railroad Station (uncredited)
 Little Nellie Kelly (1940) as Miss Wilson - Nurse with Baby (uncredited)
 Go West (1940) as Baby's Mother on Stagecoach (uncredited)
 Maisie Was a Lady (1941) as Nurse (uncredited)
 Men of Boys Town (1941) as Nun in Infirmary (uncredited)
 The People vs. Dr. Kildare (1941) as Dr. Carew's Secretary (uncredited)
 Love Crazy (1941) as Renny's Secretary (uncredited)
 The Getaway (1941) as Dr. Glass' Maid (uncredited)
 Whistling in the Dark (1941) as Cult Member / Telephone Operator (uncredited)
 When Ladies Meet (1941) as Anna (uncredited)
 Honky Tonk (1941) as Salvation Army Woman (uncredited)
 Babes on Broadway (1941) as Juror at Radio Broadcast (uncredited)
 Babes on Broadway (1941) as Mrs. Crainen, the Matron (uncredited)
 Nazi Agent (1942) as Woman (uncredited)
 The Vanishing Virginian (1942) as Mildred Simpson (uncredited)
 Mr. and Mrs. North (1942) as Lucille, Mrs. Brent's Maid (uncredited)
 Dr. Kildare's Victory (1942) as Dr. Carew's Secretary (uncredited)
 Born to Sing (1942) as Woman at Accident Scene (uncredited)
 We Were Dancing (1942) as Tearful Courtroom Spectator (uncredited)
 The Courtship of Andy Hardy (1942) as Elsa, Nesbit's Maid (uncredited)
 Ship Ahoy (1942) as Mrs. Loring (uncredited)
 Tortilla Flat (1942) as Nun (uncredited)
 Calling Dr. Gillespie (1942) as Carew's Secretary Bringing Postcard (uncredited)
 Reunion in France (1942) as Mme. Vigouroux (uncredited)
 The Human Comedy (1943) as Woman on Street (uncredited)
 Assignment in Brittany (1943) as Surgical Nurse (uncredited)
 Slightly Dangerous (1943) as Customer (uncredited)
 Presenting Lily Mars (1943) as Assistant Boardinghouse Manager (uncredited)
 Dr. Gillespie's Criminal Case (1943) as Secretary (uncredited)
 Du Barry Was a Lady (1943) as Ambrose's Wife (uncredited)
 Best Foot Forward (1943) as Chaperon at Dance (uncredited)
 The Cross of Lorraine (1943) as Village Woman (uncredited)
 Lost Angel (1943) as Telephone Operator (uncredited)
 Andy Hardy's Blonde Trouble (1944) as Dean's Secretary (uncredited)
 Meet the People (1944) as Ritz Patron (uncredited)
 An American Romance (1944) as Hospitable Farm Woman (uncredited)
 The Clock (1945) as USO Manager (uncredited)
 Girls of the Big House (1945) as Visitors Matron (uncredited) (final film role)

Shorts

 Three on a Limb (1936) as Addie
 The Public Pays (1936) as Markovitz's Secretary (uncredited)
 The Grand Bounce (1937) as Doctor's Secretary (uncredited)
 Song of Revolt (1937) as Peasant Woman (uncredited)
 It May Happen to You (1937) as Nurse (uncredited)
 Miracle Money (1938) as Miss Grant (uncredited)
 That Mothers Might Live (1938) as Nun Reading Book (uncredited)
 Come Across (1938) as Bank Employee (uncredited)
 How to Read (1938) as Dental Patient (uncredited)
 Nostradamus (1938) as Minor Role (uncredited)
 Men in Fright (1938) as Sonny's Mother (uncredited)
 Football Romeo (1938) as Alfalfa's Mother
 Alfalfa's Aunt (1939) as Martha Switzer (uncredited)
 Tiny Troubles (1939) as Alfalfa's mother
 Radio Hams (1939) as Mrs. Crane (uncredited)
 Angel of Mercy (1939) as Nurse (uncredited)
 One Against the World (1939) as Townswoman (uncredited)
 Think First (1939) as Saleslady (uncredited)
 Miracle at Lourdes (1939) as Nurse (uncredited)
 That Inferior Feeling (1940) as Bride (uncredited)
 Alfalfa's Double (1940) as Alfalfa's mother
 Pound Foolish (1940) as Mayor's Secretary (uncredited)
 The Domineering Male (1940) as Party Hostess (uncredited)
 All About Hash (1940) as Martha, Alfalfa's mother
 Bubbling Troubles (1940) as Alfalfa's Mom
 Women in Hiding (1940) as Miss Townsend - Head Nurse (uncredited)
 A Way in the Wilderness (1940) as Sick Farmer's Wife (uncredited)
 Soak the Old (1940) as Bogus Pension Office Employee (uncredited)
 Good Bad Boys (1940) as Alfalfa's Mother (uncredited)
 You, the People (1940) as Rooming House Diner (uncredited)
 American Spoken Here (1940) as Corset Buyer (uncredited)
 Respect the Law (1941) as Johnson's Maid (uncredited)
 1-2-3 Go! (1941) as Ann, nurse
 Coffins on Wheels (1941) as First Nurse - at Desk (uncredited)
 Sucker List (1941) as Secretary (uncredited)
 Come Back, Miss Pipps (1941) as Angry Parent (uncredited)
 Wedding Worries (1941) as Miss Douglas (uncredited)
 Main Street on the March! (1941) as Nurse (uncredited)
 Don't Talk (1942) as Beauty Shop Customer (uncredited)
 The Lady or the Tiger? (1942) as Lady Behind Door in Arena (uncredited)
 Mr. Blabbermouth! (1942) as Woman (uncredited)
 Rover's Big Chance (1942) as Studio clerk
 Inflation (1942) as Woman in Close-Out Sale Montage (uncredited)
 Brief Interval (1943) as Nurse (uncredited)
 Benjamin Franklin, Jr. (1943) as Janet's mother
 Family Troubles (1943) as Mary Burston, Janet's mother
 Who's Superstitious? (1943) as Wife (uncredited)
 Seeing Hands (1943) as Ben's Mother (uncredited)

References

External links

 
 
 
 Last of the Mohicans (1920), starring Wallace Beery and Barbara Bedford, on YouTube
 Tumbleweeds (1925), starring William S. Hart and Barbara Bedford, on YouTube

American film actresses
American silent film actresses
People from Crawford County, Wisconsin
Actresses from Wisconsin
1903 births
1981 deaths
20th-century American actresses
People from Jacksonville, Florida
People from Shreveport, Louisiana
People from Prairie du Chien, Wisconsin